Scedella boxiana is a species of tephritid or fruit flies in the genus Scedella of the family Tephritidae.

Distribution
Congo, Ghana, Cameroon.

References

Tephritinae
Insects described in 1957
Diptera of Africa